N.F. Smith & Associates, also known as Smith, or Smith & Associates, is an independent distributor of electronic components and semiconductors headquartered in Houston, Texas.

History

The 1990s saw marked growth for the company. In 1992, Smith's annual sales were $30 million; by 1998, they had topped $470 million due to the company's expansion of its business into new regions, industries, and service offerings. In 1997, the company moved into its new 60,000 sq. ft. headquarters in Houston, followed by the opening of its first major international office in Hong Kong that same year. Smith established a European presence with the opening of its Amsterdam office in 1999.

In 2000, the company completed construction of a 15,000 sq. ft. warehouse in Houston to expand its ability to handle OEM and CEM consignment and excess inventories. Smith opened offices in Seoul, Silicon Valley, and Guadalajara in 2000, followed by office openings in New York in 2003 and Shanghai in 2004. By 2004, global sales exceeded $500 million. In 2017 global sales exceeded $1 billion for the first time. 

In 2010, the company completed construction of an enhanced, in-house, anti-counterfeit laboratory at its headquarters. Smith relocated the laboratory to a 57,199 sq. ft. operational facility in November 2014. The company opened physical trading offices in Shenzhen, China in 2008, Taipei in 2011, Austin in 2013, Penang in 2014, Bangalore in 2015, and Cluj-Napoca, Munich, and Beijing in 2017, and Berlin in 2021. From 2017-2021, Smith operated in the solar market.

Products and sourcing
Smith sources and distributes active, passive, and electromechanical IC components, as well as computer products and peripherals such as HDDs, processors, memory modules, video cards - both obsolete and in-production parts. It serves customers in a broad range of industries, including consumer electronics, enterprise electronics, server hardware, automotive, telecommunications, medical, oil and gas, energy, and aeronautics and defense.

Services
Over time, the company expanded on the shortage sourcing that characterized its earliest business model. Services offered include inventory management programs such as VMI or EOL models, third-party purchasing, excess inventory management, IT Asset Disposition (ITAD) and secure data erasure, HDD & SSD services, rework, component recovery, reverse logistics, and kitting.

Quality
Smith's quality practices include vendor evaluation and approval, followed by formal visual inspection of incoming product from the outer packaging inward. Parts that pass visual inspection may move on to the next level of inspection.

The company uses its in-house lab resources to confirm product quality, origin, and conformity. The company's testing resources include decapsulation, chemical testing, x-ray testing, x-ray fluorescence, microscopic inspection, solderability testing, counterfeit IC testing, C-SAM acoustic microscopic inspection, bond/shear strength testing, and functionality testing for a range of components. The company's anti-counterfeit laboratory located in Houston is accredited under ISO/IEC 17025, as is its Hong Kong laboratory.

Additionally, the company is certified to ISO 9001, ANSI-ESD S. 20–20, CCAP-101, AS9120, AS6081, ISO 13485, and OHSAS 18001, and is a member of ISA, C-TPAT, GIDEP  and ERAI. Smith has attained the DLA and QTSL supplier qualifications.

Sustainability
Since 2011, Smith has been “committed to work toward becoming a climate neutral, zero waste-to-landfill distributor.”

Smith began placing a heavy corporate emphasis on sustainability in 2008, when an ISO 14001 audit revealed deficiencies in the company's environmental program. Smith used these results as a catalyst to undertake improvements, including switching out lighting, using only 100% recycled packaging for shipments, and focusing on reducing energy consumption.

In 2011, Smith completed a sustainable renovation of its headquarters building, including a 140 kW solar installation and the installation of a cool roof and efficient HVAC system. In addition, the company instituted internal programs for recycling, resource reduction, and sustainability training. On April 8, 2012, Smith was named Overall Winner: Greatest Implementation of Green Building Innovations in the City of Houston's 2011 Green Office Challenge, the nation's largest Green Office Challenge for 2011. Smith has recognized sustainability as a core corporate value, and continues to promote these efforts internally. Smith's headquarters have been certified to ISO 14001 since 2005 and to R2 since 2015.

References

Computer hardware companies
Electronics companies of the United States
Networking hardware companies
Technology companies of the United States
Companies based in Houston
Multinational companies headquartered in the United States
American companies established in 1984
1984 establishments in Texas